The Wuhan Union Hospital is a largest teaching hospital and oldest historical hospital was since 1866 in Jianghan District, Wuhan, Hubei, China.

History
The hospital was founded by Griffith John on September 8, 1866, as Hankow Renji Hospital. In 1928, it was renamed as Hankow Union Hospital. In 1950, it was placed under the jurisdiction of the Medical College of Wuhan University. In 1953, it became the First Affiliated Hospital of Wuhan Medical College. In 1985, it became the Union Hospital of Tongji Medical University. In 2000, it became the Union Hospital of Tongji Medical College of Huazhong University of Science and Technology.

In 2020, the hospital became one of the designated hospitals to treat patients with COVID-19 during the COVID-19 pandemic.

Architecture
The hospital consists of the Main Campus, West Campus, Tumor Center and Jinyinhu Hospital. It can accommodate a total of 5,000 beds.

Transportation
The hospital is accessible within walking distance east of Zhongshan Park Station of Wuhan Metro.

References

External links
 

1866 establishments in China
Hospitals established in 1866
Hospitals in Wuhan
Jianghan District